Pseudostegania lijiangensis is a moth in the family Geometridae. It is found in China (Yunnan).

References

Moths described in 2010
Asthenini
Moths of Asia